Sadovka is a rural locality (a selo) in Burikazganovsky Selsoviet, Sterlitamaksky District, Bashkortostan, Russia. The population was 424 as of 2010. There are 2 streets.

Geography 
Sadovka is located 23 km northwest of Sterlitamak (the district's administrative centre) by road. Talachevo is the nearest rural locality.

References 

Rural localities in Sterlitamaksky District